The Burma Tournament 1995, alternatively known as the 4-nation Tiger Trophy, was an international association football  friendly tournament organised by Myanmar Football Federation (MFF). It took place from 27 October to 4 November 1995 in Myanmar.

Participants countries 
The following four teams will contest in the tournament. FIFA ranking as of 17 October 1995.

Venue
All matches were held at the Thuwunna Stadium in Yangon, Myanmar.

Group stage
The four teams competing against each other in the group stage in a single round-robin method. At the end of group matches, the top two teams advanced to the final and two teams were eliminated, all that is known otherwise is that Myanmar and Bangladesh finished 1st and 2nd while Sri Lanka lost all matches without scoring a goal.

Table

Final

Statistics

Goalscorers
All the goalscorers in this tournament have not been recorded

Champions

References

International association football competitions hosted by Myanmar
International association football competitions in Asia
November 1995 sports events in Asia
1995 in Burmese sport